Mymensingh is a district in Mymensingh Division, Bangladesh, and is bordered on the north by Meghalaya, a state of India and the Garo Hills, on the south by Gazipur District, on the east by the districts of Netrokona and Kishoreganj, and on the west by the districts of Sherpur, Jamalpur and Tangail.  Mymensingh is the 8th administrative divisional headquarter and 12th city corporation of Bangladesh. According to Ministry of Public Administration, Mymensingh is ranked 4th in district status. The density of Mymensingh city is 44,458/km2 (115,150/sq mi) which is the second most densely populated city in Bangladesh. Mymensingh attracts 25 percent of health tourists visiting Bangladesh. Once known as the largest district of the Indian subcontinent. Mymensingh town is the district headquarters.

Geography
The district covers an area of 4363.48 km2, with several small valleys between high forests.

The temperature ranges from 12 to 33 °C, and the annual rainfall averages 2,174 mm.

It is at the foot of Garo hills of Meghalaya, and includes some chars (sandy islands) founded on the bed of the Old Brahmaputra River and also some ancient forests of mainly a single wood tree, the sal tree.

The city of Mymensingh stands on the bank of the Old Brahmaputra, as beginning in 1787 the main flow of the Brahmaputra shifted to the Jamuna River which flows west of the greater Mymensingh region. After about hundred years, a port city of sea vessels from England lost its status as the river became a seasonal flow. Some former residences of colonial officials along the side of the river in the city are nowadays government buildings.

The area of Greater Mymensingh, the north front line is just at the foot of Garo hills of Meghalaya of India, the south this area excludes Gazipur District, the east ends in the rich watery land of Bangladesh as native calls 'Haor', the west ends in the ancient single wood forest (e.g. Muktagacha, Fulbaria and Valuka upazilas) and the Chars of Jamalpur District sided north-west of Mymensingh district.

Forests
The Madhupur jungle is a slightly elevated tract, extending from the north of Dhaka district into the heart of Mymensingh; its average height is about 60 ft above the level of the surrounding country, and it nowhere exceeds 100 ft. The jungle contains abundance of sal, valuable both as timber and charcoal. The main benefits of sal is that it can absorb carbon more than any other native trees, so it helps mitigate the severe pollution of Dhaka city. The only other elevated tract in the district is on the northern border, where the Susang Durgapur situated in Netrokona district (part of Greater Mymensingh). Actually the Haluaghat upozilla of Mymensingh is border with India and Garo hills of Meghalaya. They are for the most part covered with thick thorny jungle, but in parts are barren and rocky.

Rivers
Mymensingh formerly contained the mighty Brahmaputra river. However after it shifted back into the Jamuna river channel at the end of the 19th century, the area of present-day Mymensingh district contains very few rivers. The Old Brahmaputra still flows through Mymensingh city.

Climate

History
The early history of Mymensingh is little known. Due to its general isolation from the more populous centres of Bengal, this territory was always loosely-controlled by the state and was a frontier area dividing the more populous regions of Bengal from the Garo Hills. Between the 14th and 18th centuries, the lands of Mymensingh were generally ruled by political adventurers who came to Mymensingh after a defeat. The territory was nominally under Mughal control, but the Mughal state had very little influence in the region, separated as it was from the rest of Bengal by the mighty Brahmaputra, which at the time still flowed in its old channel through Mymensingh.

The district was acquired by the East India Company with the Dewani Grant from the Mughal Emperor in 1765. At that time its greater part was included in the Niabat (Sub-Province of Dhaka) and a small portion in the Zamindaries of Atia, Kagmari, Pukuria and Patilandaha (of Rahahahi Zamindari). At the time of Permanent Settlement, it included northwest Garo-Hills and the Brahmandaria Subdivision of the Present Comilla district but did not include north Tangail and north-west part of Jamalpur.

After the Great Famine, the Fakir-Sannyasi rebellion took place, where armed Fakirs and Sanyasis fought against the colonial power and the Zamindars, who at the time were still largely independent. Some of these armed godmen found employment as retainers of the Zamindars, and often fought for them, while also sometimes fighting their own employers. Because of the constant fighting and instability, often the Zamindars relied on the British administration to help maintain their power, which resulted in the British gaining more and more influence over the Zamindars.

Furthermore, starting in the 1780s, the Brahmaputra began to shift back to its old channel in the Jamuna, which led to a decrease in agricultural output in the region. However the Zamindars still needed to maintain their revenue and began exploiting the peasants even more. This led to the Pagalpanthi peasant movement. The Pagalpanthis were a syncretic group who combined Hinduism, Islam and local folk religion and also resisted the oppression of the Zamindars. The Pagalpanthis soon began to rebel against the Zamindars and Britishers.

In 1799 Taluk Amirabad was transferred to Tippera (Comilla). In 1809, Patiladaha, situated north-east of the Brahmaputra came to district form Rangpur. In 1811, the river Banar and Brahmaputra were declared boundary between Dhaka and Mymensingh district and the river Brahmaputra and Meghna as boundary between Tippera (now Comilla) and Mymensingh and Dhaka. In 1811 west Gar-Hills were transferred to Rangpur district. In 1812 Patiladaha, was retransferred to Rangpur. In 1830, Parganas Sarail, Daudpur, Haripur, Bejra, and Satarakhandal, were transferred to Tippera and Public convenience. In 1855, due to change in river course part or Serajganj thana was transferred from Mymensingh to Pabna and in 1866, the whole of it was transferred to Pabna. In 1866, thana Dewangajn was transferred to Mymensingh from Bogra and thana Atia from Dhaka. In 1867 for the administrative convenience boundaries of five subdivisions (including Tangail) and Thanas were notified. In 1874 on the basis of survey, the district boundaries were notified. In 1874 the Jamuna (or Daokoba) River was declared the western boundary between Mymensingh and Bogra and as such, 165 villages were transferred to Bogra. In 1875, the Brahmaputra was Made the boundary between Mymensingh and Rangpur and the portion of Patiladaha, east of the river, was transferred to this district form Rangpur. In 1877, the Jamuna was declared the boundary between Pabna and Mymensingh, in the west. On the first of December 1969, Tangail subdivision was separated from Mymensingh and a new District of Tangail was formed. Then in 1977 another new district Jamalpur (including Sherpur) was formed.

Timeline
1772-1790 Fakir and Sannyasi revolt
1787 Floods
1788 Famines
1897 Earthquake
1905 Swadeshi Movement
1947 Breakdown of British India
1971 Liberation war
2015 8th division of Bangladesh

Administrative divisions

Mymensingh district was established in 1787, which was later on reorganised into six districts, namely, Tangail, Jamalpur, Kishoreganj, Sherpur, Netrokona, and Mymensingh. Currently, Mymensingh district has a city corporation, eight municipalities and thirteen upazilas. One of the most eminent District Magistrate and Collectors of Mymensingh district was Gurusaday Dutt, Esq., ICS, the first Indian to come first in any part of the Open Competitive Services Examination then held in England.

Major zamindaris of Mymensingh (before 1947) 
Susanga (Maharaja) (3rd in the Order of Precedence in the Government House of Calcutta before 1947)
Muktagagacha (also called Mymensingh) (Maharaja)
Ramgopalpur (Raja)
Gouripur (Babu)
Kalipur (Babu)
Malotipur

Demographics

According to the 2011 Bangladesh census, Mymensingh District had a population of 5,110,272, of which 2,539,124 were males and 2,571,148 females. Rural population was 4,312,145 (84.38%) while the urban population was 798,127 (15.62%). Mymensingh District had a literacy rate of 43.49% for the population 7 years and above: 44.86% for males and 42.16% for females.

Muslims formed 95.79% of the population, Hindus 3.58%, Christians 0.56% and others 0.07%. Although all religions are predominantly rural, almost a third of Hindus live in urban areas. 35,907 are from ethnic minorities.

Railroads
A branch line of the Eastern Bengal railway runs north from Dhaka through Nasirabad etc.

Town

Mymensingh town, earlier known as Nasirabad, is on the west bank of Brahmaputra River. The population is around 225,811. Having Bangladesh Agricultural University, Jatiya Kabi Kazi Nazrul Islam University, Mymensingh Engineering College, Teachers Training College-Women, Teachers Training College-Both, Government Laboratory High School, Mymensingh, Mymensingh Zilla School, Govt. Mumenunnesa College, Ananda Mohan College, huge bridge on Brahmaputra river, two medical colleges (Mymensingh Medical College, Community Based Medical College), eight high schools, Raj bari, and surrounding farm lands, Mymensingh is one of the best places for living and educating children in Bangladesh. Because there are very few fuel run-vehicles, sound pollution and air pollution levels are very low. There is no public boys college in Mymensingh town; however, every year many students from the town are admitted to various universities and medical colleges in Bangladesh. Mymensingh Girls Cadet College is the nation's first military high school for girls. Much land occupied by various churches in Mymensingh city in relation to number of followers.

Religious institutions include 2,362 mosques, 1,020 temples, 600 Buddhist temples, and 36 churches.

Zainul Udyan beside the river Brahmaputra, Circuit House Park, Botanical Garden, BAU, Shoshi Lodge are the places visited in the city.

Notes

References

 

 
Districts of Bangladesh
Districts of Bangladesh established before 1971
Districts of Mymensingh Division